Tsepelevo is a rural locality (a village) in Kopninskoye Rural Settlement, Sobinsky District, Vladimir Oblast, Russia. The population was 49 as of 2010.

Geography 
Tsepelevo is located 28 km southwest of Sobinka (the district's administrative centre) by road. Kopnino is the nearest rural locality.

References 

Rural localities in Sobinsky District